Tom Chatterton (February 12, 1881 – August 17, 1952) was an American actor and director..

Born in Geneva, New York, Chatterton was active in sports as a youth. He gained early acting experience with Ben Horning's stock theater company in Syracuse, New York. He worked with several stock theater companies, and for three years he portrayed the mayor in a touring company of The Man of the Hour. He also was active in vaudeville.

He began his film career in 1913 at the New York Motion Picture Company under director Thomas H. Ince. Although never a major star, Chatterton had several leading roles in early silent films. He appeared in a large number of westerns and was able to adapt to talkies allowing him to have a successful career lasting five decades.

Chatterton was also a film director.

He died in Hollywood in 1952 and was interred in the Glenwood Cemetery in his hometown of Geneva.

Selected filmography

 The Open Door (1913, Short) - Rev. Walton
 The Voice at the Telephone (1914) - Dick Carson
 On the Night Stage (1915) - Stagecoach Driver (uncredited)
 The Secret of the Submarine (1915) - Lt. Jarvis Hope
 Father and the Boys (1915)
 A Soul Enslaved (1916) - Richard Newton
 Bluff (1916) - Harold Wainwright
 Beloved Rogues (1917) - Jack Kennedy
 Whither Thou Goest (1917) - Tom Van Wye
 At the Mercy of Tiberius (1920) - Lennox Dunbar
 The Gilded Dream (1920) - Jasper Halroyd
 Her Husband's Friend (1920) - Princeton Hadley
 Would You Forgive? (1920) - John Cleveland
 The Boss Rider of Gun Creek (1936) - Sheriff Blaine
 Sandflow (1937) - Sheriff
 Venus Makes Trouble (1937) - Kenneth Rowland
 You Can't Beat Love (1937) - Mr. Raymond (uncredited)
 A Fight to the Finish (1937) - Mayberry
 The Toast of New York (1937) - Fisk Broker (uncredited)
 It Happened in Hollywood (1937) - Bank Manager (uncredited)
 Sudden Bill Dorn (1937) - Morgan
 All American Sweetheart (1937) - Thatcher (uncredited)
 This Marriage Business (1938) - Mr. Grant (uncredited)
 Under Western Stars (1938) - Congressman Edward H. Marlowe
 Sky Giant (1938) - Johnson (uncredited)
 Smashing the Rackets (1938) - Grand Juryman (uncredited)
 Hold That Co-ed (1938) - Political Adviser (uncredited)
 Hawk of the Wilderness (1938) - Dr. Edward Munro
 Kentucky (1938) - Man at Race Track (uncredited)
 Arizona Legion (1939) - Commissioner Teagle
 The Oklahoma Kid (1939) - Homesteader (uncredited)
 Trouble in Sundown (1939) - Brown - Prosecuting Attorney (uncredited)
 The Story of Vernon and Irene Castle (1939) - Announcer at Benefit (uncredited)
 Dodge City (1939) - Passenger (uncredited)
 The Man Who Dared (1939) - Police Commissioner (uncredited)
 Man of Conquest (1939) - Official (uncredited)
 Thunder Afloat (1939) - Lieutenant (uncredited)
 Calling All Marines (1939) - Judge (uncredited)
 Rovin' Tumbleweeds (1939) - Speaker of the House (uncredited)
 Laugh It Off (1939) - Politician (uncredited)
 The Big Guy (1939) - Doctor (uncredited)
 Abe Lincoln in Illinois (1940) - Minor Role (uncredited)
 Village Barn Dance (1940) - Station Executive (uncredited)
 Drums of Fu Manchu (1940) - Prof. Edward Randolph
 Flash Gordon Conquers the Universe (1940, Serial) - Professor Arden [Chs. 1, 4]
 Covered Wagon Days (1940) - Major J.A. Norton
 Hot Steel (1940) - Bank Director (uncredited)
 Black Diamonds (1940) - Dr. Lukas
 Son of Roaring Dan (1940) - Stuart Manning
 The Trail Blazers (1940) - Major R.C. Kelton
 Pony Post (1940) - Maj. Goodwin
 Desert Bandit (1941) - Texas Ranger Capt. Banning
 Outlaws of Cherokee Trail (1941) - Capt. Sheldon
 Honky Tonk (1941) - Townsman (uncredited)
 Reap the Wild Wind (1942) - Parson (uncredited)
 Raiders of the Range (1942) - 'Doc' Higgins
 Overland Mail (1942) - Tom Gilbert
 Santa Fe Scouts (1943) - Neil Morgan
 Adventures of the Flying Cadets (1943, Serial) - Railroad Conductor [Ch. 2] (uncredited)
 Captain America (1944, Serial) - J.C. Henley [Chs. 6-8]
 Rosie the Riveter (1944) - Official (uncredited)
 Tucson Raiders (1944) - Judge James Wayne
 Man from Frisco (1944) - Doctor (uncredited)
 Marshal of Reno (1944) - The Judge
 Cheyenne Wildcat (1944) - Jason Hopkins
 Code of the Prairie (1944) - Marshal Bat Matson
 An American Romance (1944) - Board of Directors Member (uncredited)
 Zorro's Black Whip (1944, Serial) - Crescent City Councilman
 I'll Remember April (1945) - Board Member (uncredited)
 The Phantom Speaks (1945) - Prison Chaplain (uncredited)
 Lone Texas Ranger (1945) - Sheriff Iron Mike Haines
 Mama Loves Papa (1945) - Speaker (uncredited)
 Love, Honor and Goodbye (1945) - Minor Role (uncredited)
 Marshal of Laredo (1945) - Reverend Parker
 Colorado Pioneers (1945) - Father Marion
 Lawless Empire (1945) - Editor Enders (uncredited)
 Gay Blades (1946) - Babson (uncredited)
 Sheriff of Redwood Valley (1946) - Doc Ellis
 Alias Billy the Kid (1946) - Ed Pearson
 Home on the Range (1946) - Grizzly Garth
 Without Reservations (1946) - Pullman Conductor (uncredited)
 The Searching Wind (1946) - Joe - Chauffeur (uncredited)
 Conquest of Cheyenne (1946) - Rancher Jones
 Heading West (1946) - Dr. Wyatt (uncredited)
 The Locket (1946) - Art Critic (uncredited)
 It's a Wonderful Life (1946) - Townsman (uncredited)
 Stagecoach to Denver (1946) - Doc Kimball
 California (1947) - Joe (uncredited)
 West of Dodge City (1947) - Banker (uncredited)
 Smash-Up, the Story of a Woman (1947) - Edwards, Ken's Butler (uncredited)
 The Trouble with Women (1947) - Mr. Krock (uncredited)
 Something in the Wind (1947) - Bronston (uncredited)
 Jesse James Rides Again (1947, Serial) - Sheriff Mark Tobin (uncredited)
 The Fabulous Texan (1947) - Citizen (uncredited)
 Secret Beyond the Door (1947) - Judge (uncredited)
 Heart of Virginia (1948) - Dr. Purdy
 Carson City Raiders (1948) - John Davis
 Marshal of Amarillo (1948) - James Underwood
 The Denver Kid (1948) - Doctor (uncredited)
 Outlaw Brand (1948) - Tom Chadwick
 Family Honeymoon (1948) - Stewart (uncredited)
 Highway 13 (1948) - J.E. Norris (uncredited)
 The Life of Riley (1949) - Minor Role (uncredited)
 Gun Law Justice (1949) - Bill Thorp (uncredited)
 Prince of the Plains (1949) - Ned Owens (uncredited)
 The Wyoming Bandit (1949) - Doctor (uncredited) (final film role)

References

External links

 

1881 births
1952 deaths
American male film actors
American male silent film actors
People from Geneva, New York
Male Western (genre) film actors
Burials in New York (state)
20th-century American male actors